Rabb Se Hai Dua is an Indian Hindi-language drama television series that premiered on 28 November 2022 on Zee TV and is digitally available on ZEE5. Produced by Prateek Sharma under LSD Films Private Limited. It stars Richa Rathore, Karanvir Sharma and Aditi Sharma. It replaced Sanjog in its timeslot. 

The show revolves around the life of Dua, whose perfect life is shattered when her husband marries another woman.

Plot
Haider Akhtar is a responsible garment shop owner who is married to a little-educated homemaker from Farooqabad, Dua. Haider's relation is not good with Rahaat (Haider's father) because he married Gulnaaz (Haider's step-mother) and Hina (Haider's mother). Soon, he meets an outspoken and courageous woman named Ghazal Rahmani but they start disliking eachother due to their frequent fights. Dua develops a friendship with Ghazal while Ruhaan (Rahaat and Gulnaaz's son) falls in love with her. After a series of events, Ghazal and Haider overcome their dislike, and Haider and Dua offer shelter to Ghazal in their house, when her house gets destroyed in a major earthquake.

Hina reveals a major secret to Dua. Ghazal's parents, Saqib and Zeenat came to their shop about twenty-two years ago to buy clothes. When they saw an ill eight-year-old Haider, Saqib ran away with his wife carrying Haider in his arms, so that he could be taken to the doctor. Hina saw them. Saqib had fled by then. Hina thought that they might be kidnapping Haider and accused Zeenat, due to which the mob beat her to death. Hina promised Saqib that if he asks for something for Ghazal, she will definitely give it. Before dying of cancer, Saqib had proposed Ghazal's marriage to Haider, but Hina and Rahaat could not accept it because Dua and Haider's alliance was fixed. And all of this was not known to anyone except the elders of the Akhtar family.

Haider's grandmother, Anjum cautions Dua to expel Ghazal as she might destroy her after knowing the reason of Zeenat's death. Gradually, Ghazal falls in love with Haider. Gulnaaz decides to use her as a weapon in separating Haider from Dua. Due to her conspiracy, Hina reveals everything to Ghazal. Ghazal pretends that she has forgiven Hina, but joins hands with Gulnaaz to kill Hina and marry Haider. Hina starts considering Ghazal as her daughter. Ghazal creates rifts between Dua and Haider. After a series of events, she reveals her plan to Dua. Dua tries to marry her off but fails as Ghazal claims that she loves Ruhaan.    

She turns Noor (Ruhaan's sister), Ruhaan and Hina against Dua. Anjum tries to expel her but fails. Ghazal causes Anjum to become paralysed as she had found evidence against her. She causes Dua to fire their trusted and loyal house-help, Mumtaz "Momo", since she had heard Gulnaaz and Ghazal's plan.

Cast

Main
 Karanvir Sharma as Haider "Haidu" Akhtar: Rahaat and Hina's son; Gulnaaz's step-son; Qainaat's brother; Ruhaan and Noor's half-brother; Anjum's elder grandson; Dua's husband (2022-present)
 Richa Rathore as Ghazal Rahmani: Saqib and Zeenat's only daughter; Haider's one-sided-lover; Ruhaan's fiancée; Dua's friend-turned-enemy; Iqbal's distant cousin (2022-present) 
 Aditi Sharma as Dua Haider Akhtar: Haider's wife; Ghazal's friend-turned-enemy; Altaf's cousin (2022-present)

Recurring 
 Sheela Sharma as Anjum Bano "Dadi" Akhtar: Rahaat's mother; Haider, Qainaat, Ruhaan and Noor’s grandmother (2022-present)
 Melanie Nazareth as Gulnaaz Akhtar: Rahaat's second wife; Ruhaan and Noor's mother; Haider and Qainaat's step-mother (2022-present)
 Nishigandha Wad as Hina Akhtar: Rahaat's first wife; Haider and Qainaat's mother; Ruhaan and Noor's step-mother (2022-present)
 Ankit Raizada as Ruhaan Akhtar: Rahaat  and Gulnaaz's son; Hina's step-son; Anjum's younger grandson; Noor's brother; Haider and Qainaat's half-brother; Ghazal's one-sided-lover turned fiancé (2022-present)
 Sandeep Rajora as Rahaat Akhtar: Anjum's son; Hina and Gulnaaz's husband; Haider, Qainaat, Ruhaan and Noor’s father (2022-present)
 Saarvie Omana as Qainaat Akhtar: Rahaat and Hina's daughter; Gulnaaz's step-daughter; Anjum's elder granddaughter; Haider's sister; Ruhaan and Noor's half-sister (2022-present)
 Simran Upadhyay as Noor Akhtar: Rahaat and Gulnaaz's daughter; Ruhaan's sister; Haider and Qainaat's half-sister; Anjum's younger granddaughter (2022-present)
 Manuj Nagpal as Iqbal Rahmani: A goon who is also Ghazal's distant cousin (2022)
 Sachin Sharma as Ravi: Haider's manager (2022-2023)
 Shalu Shreya as Mumtaz "Momo" Sheikh: A former maidservant in the Akhtar household (2022-2023)
 Shiv Singh Shrinet as Police Inspector (in a cameo appearance) (2023)

Production

Development
The series is produced by Prateek Sharma under the banner of LSD Films Private Limited. It is Zee TV's third show with an Islamic background after Qubool Hai and Ishq Subhan Allah.

Casting
Karanvir Sharma was cast to portray the lead Haider, marking his return after Shaurya Aur Anokhi Ki Kahani.

It was reported that Aalisha Panwar would be the lead, but Aditi Sharma was cast as the lead Dua, marking her television comeback after Yehh Jadu Hai Jinn Ka!.

News were that Roopal Tyagi will be the role of Ghazal, but finally Richa Rathore was cast to portray Ghazal opposite Karanvir Sharma. Sheela Sharma was cast as Anjum (Dadi).

See also  
 List of programmes broadcast by Zee TV

References

External links
 Rabb Se Hai Dua on ZEE5

Zee TV original programming
2022 Indian television series debuts
Hindi-language television shows